Jean-Louis Taberd (1794–1840) was a French missionary of the Paris Foreign Missions Society, and titular bishop of Isauropolis, in partibus infidelium.

Career
Born in Saint-Étienne, Jean-Louis Taberd was ordained priest in Lyon in 1817. He joined the Paris Foreign Missions Society in 1820, and was appointed to become a missionary in Cochinchina, modern Vietnam. In 1827 he was appointed Vicar Apostolic of Cochinchina, and Bishop of the titular see of Isauropolis in 1830. With the persecutions of the Emperor of Vietnam Minh Mạng, Mgr Taberd was forced to escape the country.

Jean-Louis Taberd first went to Penang and then Calcutta, where, with the help of Lord Auckland and the Asiatic Society he was able to publish his own Latin-Vietnamese dictionary in 1838. He improved upon the previous works of Alexandre de Rhodes and Pigneau de Béhaine, whose 1773 Vietnamese-Latin dictionary he had been handed in manuscript form. He also published Pigneau's dictionary in 1838 under the name Dictionarium Anamitico-Latinum.

In his work The Geography of Cochin China, Taberd reports the Paracel Islands (today a hotly disputed island territory in Southeast Asia) as having been conquered and claimed by Emperor Gia Long in 1816.

Legacy
In the late 19th century, the renowned Catholic college Institut Taberd was founded in Saigon by the Brothers of the Christian Schools and, since 1943, to educate a Vietnamese elite.

Works
Dictionarium Latino-Annamiticum completum et novo ordine dispositum (Latin-Vietnamese dictionary), 1838
Dictionarium Anamitico-Latinum, primitus inceptum ab illustrissimo P.J. Pigneaux, dein absolutum et ed. a J. L. Taberd, Serampore, 1838
The Geography of Cochin China
Notes on the Geography of Cochin China, Journal of the Asiatic Society of Bengal 6/7 (1837/39)

References

1794 births
1840 deaths
Paris Foreign Missions Society missionaries
Roman Catholic missionaries in Vietnam
Missionary linguists
French expatriates in Vietnam